The Society of Professional Journalists (SPJ), formerly known as Sigma Delta Chi, is the oldest organization representing journalists in the United States. It was established on April 17, 1909, at DePauw University, and its charter was designed by William Meharry Glenn.

Overview
The stated mission of SPJ is to promote and defend the First Amendment guarantees of freedom of speech and freedom of the press; encourage high standards and ethical behavior in the practice of journalism; and promote and support diversity in journalism.

SPJ has nearly 300 chapters across the United States that bring educational programming to local areas and offer regular contact with other media professionals. Its membership base is more than 6,000 members of the media.

SPJ initiatives include a Legal Defense Fund that wages court battles to secure First Amendment rights; the Project Sunshine campaign, to improve the ability of journalists and the public to obtain access to government records; the magazine Quill; and the annual Sigma Delta Chi Awards, which honour excellence in journalism.

It has also drawn up a Code of Ethics that aims to inspire journalists to adhere to high standards of behavior and decision-making while performing their work.

Members of the Society of Professional Journalists (SPJ) claim to have a strong belief that public enlightenment is the forerunner of justice and the foundation of democracy. The journalists claim to work to ensure that the free exchange of information is accurate, fair and thorough. The SPJ's code of ethics states that journalists should "seek truth and report it" and that "journalists should be honest, fair, and courageous in gathering, reporting and interpreting information." The society declares the following four principles as the foundation of ethical journalism;

 Seek truth and report it: Ethical Journalism should be accurate and fair. Ethical journalists should be honest and courageous in gathering, reporting and interpreting information.
 Minimize harm: Ethical journalism treats sources, subjects, colleagues and members of the public as human beings deserving of respect.
 Act independently: The highest and primary obligation of ethical journalism is to serve the public.
 Be accountable: Ethical journalism means taking responsibility for one's work and explaining one's decisions to the public.

The Society of Professional Journalists (SPJ) encourage the use of these principles in its practice by all people in all media.

History
The Society of Professional Journalists was established on April 17, 1909, as a men's professional fraternity named Sigma Delta Chi, the ten founding members of which were Gilbert C. Clippinger, Charles A. Fisher, William M. Glenn, H. Hedges, L. Aldis Hutchens, Edward H. Lockwood, LeRoy H. Millikan, Eugene C. Pulliam, Paul M. Riddick, and Lawrence H. Sloan. The organization continued to function as a fraternity until 1960, when it became a professional society. At the 1969 San Diego convention, Sigma Delta Chi made the decision to begin admitting women into the society. In 1973, the society changed its name to Society of Professional Journalists, Sigma Delta Chi. Finally, in 1988 "Sigma Delta Chi" was dropped from the name altogether and the present Society of Professional Journalists name was officially adopted.

Budget
In 2009, The Society of Professional Journalists had revenue of $1.4 million. It spent $1.6 million.
The same year, the Sigma Delta Chi Foundation had a revenue of $934,731 and expenditures of $766,690.

Sigma Delta Chi received $312,500 in grants in 2009.

Eugene S. Pulliam First Amendment Award
The Eugene S. Pulliam First Amendment Award is awarded annually by the Society of Professional Journalists in honor of publisher Eugene S. Pulliam's dedication to First Amendment rights and values. The award seeks "to honor a person or persons who have fought to protect and preserve one or more of the rights guaranteed by the First Amendment."

Kunkel Awards
Responding to concerns originating in the Gamergate controversy, in 2015 the SPJ launched the Kunkel Awards (named after pioneering video game journalist Bill Kunkel) for game journalism. The award was folded into the Mark of Excellence Awards in 2020

Helen Thomas Award for Lifetime Achievement 
The Helen Thomas lifetime achievement award was awarded by the SPJ between 2000 and 2010. It was named after Helen Thomas, who received the first award in 2000. The award was discontinued in 2011 due to the controversy surrounding Thomas's statements about Jews and the Israeli–Palestinian conflict.

Other Awards
The SPJ also administers the Green Eyeshade Awards and the Sunshine State Awards. The Green Eyeshade Awards annually recognize journalists in Alabama, Arkansas, Florida, Georgia, Kentucky, Louisiana, Mississippi, North Carolina, South Carolina, Tennessee, and West Virginia. The Sunshine State Awards are given each year to journalists in Florida, Puerto Rico, and the U.S. Virgin Islands.

References

External links
 
 Sigma Delta Chi records at the University of Maryland Libraries

Journalism-related professional associations
Organizations established in 1909
1909 establishments in Indiana
DePauw University
Professional associations based in the United States
American journalism organizations